Asalpha or Asalfa is a neighbourhood in Ghatkopar (West), a suburb of Mumbai.

Infrastructure 
Asalpha is connected by BEST bus routes to Ghatkopar railway station. (340, 334, 421, 429, 325) Andheri railway station (340, 334, 410) Kurla railway station (325), and Chandivali (421), as well as Oshiwara (444), Borivali (226 Ltd, 470 Ltd) and Mahim (321 Ltd). Line 1 of the Mumbai Metro passes through Asalfa. The construction of Jagruti Nagar and Asalpha stations in this locality has led to rapid development of infrastructure in and around Asalfa.

Many hospitals are present in the area, including Vivek Diagnostic Centre, Abhishek Hospital, Pooja Hospital and Sona Hospital. One of the known schools in Asalpha is AIES High School (All India Education Society High School), HBVM (Hindi Bal Vidhya Mandir High School) and Theresa High School which has been providing affordable education to the community for the past 3 decades. It is covered by many slum areas and there only some of buildings, Govind Nagar and Himalaya society were the first society in Asalpha.

See also 
 Western India

References

External links 
 Asalfa Slum In Mumbai Gets A Colourful Makeover As Part Of 'Chal Rang De' Campaign by India Today
 Asalfa honey by iran Today
 Volunteers Paint The Walls Of The Asalpha Village At Ghatkopar by Getty Images

Neighbourhoods in Mumbai